Siegfried I of Ballenstedt ( – 9 March 1113), was the son of Adalbert II of Ballenstedt, and a member of the House of Ascania. He was count palatine of the Rhineland (r.1095/7-1113), and count of Weimar-Orlamünde (r.1112-1113).

Life 
Siegfried was born around 1075. He was the son of Adalbert II of Ballenstedt and Adelaide of Weimar-Orlamünde, daughter of Otto I of Meissen and his wife, Adela of Louvain. Siegfried's father, Adalbert, was murdered by Egeno II of Konradsburg in 1080, and Siegfried's brother, Otto the Rich, succeeded him as count of Ballenstedt. Siegfried inherited his father's property in Nordthüringengau.

After Adalbert's death, Siegfried's mother remarried twice, to two successive counts palatine of the Rhineland: first, Hermann II (d.1085), and then Henry of Laach (d.1095). After Henry's death, Siegfried claimed his title of count palatine of the Rhineland (r.1095/7-1113).

Influenced by the First Crusade, Siegfried is thought to have travelled to Jerusalem. In 1112 he is also said to have completed the foundation of Maria Laach Abbey, begun in 1093 by his mother, Adelaide, and his stepfather, Henry of Laach.

In 1112 Ulric II of Weimar-Orlamünde died without heirs. By virtue of his mother, Adelaide's, kinship, Siegfried then claimed Ulric's title. This led Siegfried into conflict with Emperor Henry V. Imperial partisans attacked Siegfried at the Teufelsmauer in the Harz on 21 February 1113. Siegfried survived the attack, but died of his injuries on 9 March 1113.

Marriage and children 
Siegfried married Gertrude, a daughter of Henry, Margrave of Frisia, with whom he had three children:
 Siegfried II of Weimar-Orlamünde (1107-1124)
 Adela of Weimar-Orlamünde, married Conrad I of Peilstein
 William of Weimar-Orlamünde (1112-1140)

References 
 Gerold Meyer von Knonau, 'Sigfrid (Graf von Ballenstedt), Pfalzgraf von Lothringen,' in Allgemeine Deutsche Biographie, vol. 34 (Leipzig, 1892), pp. 257f.
 J. Dendorfer, ‘Si(e)gfrid (Graf von Ballenstedt, Pfalzgraf von Lothringen),’ in Neue Deutsche Biographie, vol 24 (Berlin, 2010), pp. 345f.
 A. Thiele, Erzählende genealogische Stammtafeln zur europäischen Geschichte Band I, Teilband 1 Deutsche Kaiser-, Königs-, Herzogs- und Grafenhäuser I
 L. Partenheimer, Albrecht der Bär. Gründer der Mark Brandenburg und des Fürstentums Anhalt
 Loud, Graham A.; Schenk, Jochen, eds. (2017). The Origins of the German Principalities, 1100-1350: Essays by German Historians. Routledge.

Notes

11th-century deaths
People from Ballenstedt
House of Ascania
Counts of Germany
Counts of Weimar-Orlamünde
Counts Palatine of the Rhine